Petin is a Russian masculine surname, its feminine counterpart is Petina. Notable people with the surname include:

Irra Petina (1908-2000), Russian-born American actress and singer
Yevgeniy Petin (born 1975), Uzbekistani triple jumper

Russian-language surnames